Canadian federal elections have provided the following results in the suburban sections of Durham and York Regions.

Regional profile
The region is within the 905 Area Code (often referred to as the "905 belt"), and is populated predominantly by middle class, suburban voters. After leaning Liberal from 1968 to 1974, the area tilted conservative in the late 1970s and 1980s, when it only had three seats, helping the PCs win two majority governments in the 1980s. Support for the Co-operative Commonwealth Federation and the New Democratic Party, however, was heavy in the unionist city of Oshawa, especially when popular NDP leader Ed Broadbent held that seat from the late 1960s to late 1980s.

However, rapid growth of the Greater Toronto Area accompanied with an influx of immigrants and urban professionals turned the region into a Liberal stronghold, similar to the outer areas of the City of Toronto and the Mississauga-Brampton-Oakville area to the west of Toronto. By 2000, the Liberals swept all seven of its seats and its provincial rejection of the Tories in 2003 helped to secure Dalton McGuinty's provincial liberal landslide majority.

In 2006, the Liberals easily held onto most of the seats, with the exception of Oshawa and Whitby—Oshawa, which were taken by the Conservatives. In 2008, the Conservatives gained another two seats, Thornhill and Oak Ridges—Markham, and in a 2010 by-election the riding of Vaughan. In 2011, the Conservatives took another 3 seats (Ajax-Pickering, Pickering-Scarborough East and Richmond Hill); leaving the Liberals with one seat of nine in the area - Markham—Unionville. In 2015, however, the meltdown of Tory support in southern Ontario saw the Liberals seize all but three of the region's 12 seats, those being Oshawa, Thornhill, and surprising, Markham-Unionville.

2015 - 42nd General Election

2011 - 41st General Election

2008 - 40th General Election

2006 - 39th General Election

2004 - 38th General Election

|-
|bgcolor=whitesmoke|Ajax—Pickering
||
|Mark Holland  21,706
|
|René Soetens  14,666
|
|Kevin Modeste  5,286
|
|Karen MacDonald  1,951
|
|
|colspan="2" align="center"|new district
|-
|bgcolor=whitesmoke|Markham—Unionville
||
|John McCallum  30,442
|
|Joe Li  10,325
|
|Janice Hagan  3,993
|
|Ed Wong  1,148
|
|
||
|John McCallum
|-
|bgcolor=whitesmoke|Oak Ridges—Markham
||
|Lui Temelkovski  31,964
|
|Bob Callow  20,712
|
|Pamela Courtot  5,430
|
|Bernadette Manning  2,406
|
|Jim Conrad (PC)  820Maurice Whittle (CHP)  458
|align="center" colspan="2"|new district
|-
|bgcolor=whitesmoke|Oshawa
|
|Louise Parkes  14,510
||
|Colin Carrie  15,815
|
|Sid Ryan  15,352
|
|Liisa Whalley  1,850
|
|Tim Sullivan (M-L)  91
||
|Ivan Grose1
|-
|bgcolor=whitesmoke|Pickering—Scarborough East
||
|Dan McTeague  27,312
|
|Tim Dobson  13,417
|
|Gary Dale  5,392
|
|Matthew Pollesel  1,809
|
| 
||
|Dan McTeague
|-
|bgcolor=whitesmoke|Richmond Hill
||
|Bryon Wilfert  27,102
|
|Peter Merrifield  11,530
|
|Nella Cotrupi  4,495
|
|Tim Rudkins  2,144
|
|Ellena Lam (PC)  1,074
||
|Bryon Wilfert
|-
|bgcolor=whitesmoke|Thornhill
||
|Susan Kadis  28,709
|
|Josh Cooper  18,125
|
|Rick Morelli  3,671
|
|Lloyd Helferty  1,622
|
|Simion Iron (Ind.)  233Benjamin Fitzerman (Ind.) 241 
||
|Elinor Caplan²
|-
|bgcolor=whitesmoke|Vaughan
||
|Maurizio Bevilacqua  31,430
|
|Joe Spina  11,821
|
|Octavia Beckles  4,371
|
|Russell Korus  1,722
|
|Paolo Fabrizio (Libert.)  388Walter Aolari (CAP)  192
||
|Maurizio Bevilacqua
|-
|bgcolor=whitesmoke|Whitby—Oshawa
||
|Judi Longfield  25,649
|
|Ian MacNeil  20,531
|
|Maret Sadem-Thompson  8,002
|
|Michael MacDonald  2,759
|
| 
||
|Judi Longfield
|}

2000 - 37th General Election

References

Politics of the Regional Municipality of Durham
Politics of the Regional Municipality of York
Durham S